The 1982 Harvard Crimson football team was an American football team that represented Harvard University during the 1982 NCAA Division I-AA football season. The Crimson were one of three co-champions of the Ivy League.

In their 12th year under head coach Joe Restic, the Crimson compiled a 7–3 record and outscored opponents 259 to 136. Greg Brown was the team captain.

Harvard's 5–2 conference record put it in a three-way tie atop the Ivy League standings. The Crimson outscored Ivy opponents 191 to 88. Despite having the best in-conference and overall point differentials of the three, Harvard lost its head-to-head matchups against both of its co-champions, Dartmouth and Penn.

This was Harvard's first year in Division I-AA, after having competed in the top-level Division I-A and its predecessors since 1873.

Harvard played its home games at Harvard Stadium in the Allston neighborhood of Boston, Massachusetts.

Schedule

References

Harvard
Harvard Crimson football seasons
Ivy League football champion seasons
Harvard Crimson football
Harvard Crimson football